Minburn is a city in Dallas County, Iowa, United States. The population was 325 at the time of the 2020 census. It is part of the Des Moines–West Des Moines Metropolitan Statistical Area.

History
Minburn was laid out as a town in 1869.

Geography
Minburn is located at  (41.756048, -94.028319).

Demographics

2010 census
As of the census of 2010, there were 365 people, 154 households, and 104 families living in the city. The racial makeup of the city was 98.1% White, 0.3% African American, 0.8% Native American, 0.3% Asian, 0.3% from other races, and 0.3% from two or more races. Hispanic or Latino of any race were 1.1% of the population.

There were 154 households, of which 33.1% had children under the age of 18 living with them, 55.8% were married couples living together, 7.8% had a female householder with no husband present, 3.9% had a male householder with no wife present, and 32.5% were non-families. 26.6% of all households were made up of individuals, and 6.4% had someone living alone who was 65 years of age or older. The average household size was 2.37 and the average family size was 2.89.

The median age in the city was 38.6 years. 24.1% of residents were under the age of 18; 6% were between the ages of 18 and 24; 29.6% were from 25 to 44; 27.4% were from 45 to 64; and 12.9% were 65 years of age or older. The gender makeup of the city was 49.3% male and 50.7% female.

2000 census
As of the census of 2000, there were 391 people, 157 households, and 105 families living in the city. The racial makeup of the city was 98.47% White, 1.02% from other races, and 0.51% from two or more races. Hispanic or Latino of any race were 1.28% of the population.

There were 157 households, out of which 32.5% had children under the age of 18 living with them, 56.7% were married couples living together, 5.7% had a female householder with no husband present, and 32.5% were non-families. 31.2% of all households were made up of individuals, and 12.1% had someone living alone who was 65 years of age or older. The average household size was 2.49 and the average family size was 3.14.

In the city, the population was spread out, with 30.4% under the age of 18, 3.6% from 18 to 24, 32.7% from 25 to 44, 22.0% from 45 to 64, and 11.3% who were 65 years of age or older. The median age was 36 years. For every 100 females, there were 96.5 males. For every 100 females age 18 and over, there were 95.7 males.

The median income for a household in the city was $44,917, and the median income for a family was $49,375. Males had a median income of $32,396 versus $26,167 for females. The per capita income for the city was $19,421. About 1.6% of families and 4.5% of the population were below the poverty line, including none of those under age 18 and 16.2% of those age 65 or over.

Government

Jordan Lint served as mayor until May 2017. Kaleb Sharp became mayor in June 2017.

Education
Minburn is within the Adel–De Soto–Minburn Community School District. The district formed on July 1, 1993, as a result of the merger of the Adel–De Soto Community School District and the Central Dallas Community School District.

Notable person
 Warren Allen Smith — List of LGBT writers Warren Allen Smith, American author of Cruising the Deuce (2010), written under pseudonym Allen Windsor

See also
 Raccoon River Valley Trail

References

Cities in Iowa
Cities in Dallas County, Iowa
Des Moines metropolitan area
1869 establishments in Iowa
Populated places established in 1869